This is a list of synagogues around the world.

A
  Afghanistan: Charshi Torabazein Synagogue (Kabul), Yu Aw Synagogue (Herat)
  Albania: Valona Synagogue (Vlorë)
  Argentina: Mishkan - Centro de Espiritualidad Judía (Buenos Aires), Templo Libertad (Buenos Aires)
  Armenia: Mordechai Navi Synagogue (Yerevan)
  Aruba: Beth Israel Synagogue (Oranjestad)
 Australia: Emanuel Synagogue (Sydney)
  Austria: Hietzinger Synagoge (Vienna), Leopoldstädter Tempel (Vienna), Pazmanitentempel (Vienna), Polnische Schul (Vienna), Stadttempel (Vienna), Synagoge Neudeggergasse (Vienna), Türkischer Tempel (Vienna), Währinger Tempel (Vienna)
  Azerbaijan: see List of synagogues in Azerbaijan

B
  Bahamas: Luis de Torres Synagogue (Freeport)
  Bahrain: Bahrain Synagogue (Manama)
  Barbados: Nidhe Israel Synagogue (Bridgetown)
  Belarus: Choral Synagogue (Brest), Great Synagogue (Grodno), Slonim Synagogue (Slonim), Wołpa Synagogue (Wołpa)
  Belgium: Hollandse Synagogue (Antwerp), Great Synagogue of Europe (Brussels), Synagogue of Liège (Liege)
  Bolivia: Circulo Israelita de Bolivia (La Paz)
  Bosnia-Herzegovina: Sarajevo Synagogue (Sarajevo), Doboj Synagogue (Doboj)
  Brazil: Congregação Israelita Paulista (São Paulo), Kahal Zur Israel Synagogue (Recife), Sha'ar Hashamayim Synagogue (Belém), Centro Israelita do Paraná (Curitiba), 
  Bulgaria: see List of synagogues in Bulgaria

C
  Canada: see List of synagogues in Canada
  Chile: Sinagoga Jafetz Jaim, Aish HaTorah, Jabad, Comunidad Jaredi Jazon Ishh (Santiago)
  China: Ohel Leah Synagogue (Hong Kong), Ohel Rachel Synagogue (Shanghai)
  Colombia: Sinagoga Shaare Sedek (Barranquilla), Bet El (Barranquilla), Adat Israel (Bogota), Bet Or (Medellin)
  Costa Rica: Centro Israelita Sionista (San José)
  Croatia: List of synagogues in Croatia
  Cuba: Adath Israel (Havana), Beth Shalom Temple (Havana), Centro Hebreo Sefaradi (Havana), Chevet Achim (Havana), Communida Hebrea Tifereth Israel (Camagüey), Communidad Hebrea Hatikva (Santiago de Cuba)
  Cyprus: Larnaca Synagogue (Larnaca)
  Czech Republic: Great Synagogue (Plzeň), Old New Synagogue (Prague), Pinkas Synagogue (Prague), Maisel Synagogue (Prague), Klausová Synagogue (Prague), Jubilee Synagogue (also known as the Jerusalem Synagogue) (Prague), Front Synagogue (Třebíč), Rear Synagogue (Třebíč), Šach Synagogue (Holešov).

D
  Democratic Republic of the Congo: Beth Yaakow (Kinshasa). There is an early 20th-century synagogue, still functioning, in central Lubumbashi, DRC.
  Denmark: Great Synagogue (Copenhagen)
  Dominican Republic: Centro Israelita de República Dominicana (Santo Domingo), Sosua Synagogue (Sosua)
  Dominican Republic: Beth Midrash Sefardí Nidhe Israel (Santo Domingo), www.nidheisrael.org

E
  Egypt: see List of synagogues in Egypt
  El Salvador: Comunidad Israelita de El Salvador (San Salvador)
  Eritrea: Asmara Synagogue (Asmara)
  Ethiopia: Succat Rahamim Synagogue (Addis Ababa)
  Estonia: Beit Bella Synagogue (Tallinn)

F
  Finland: Helsinki Synagogue (Helsinki), Turku Synagogue (Turku)
  France: Grand Synagogue of Paris (Paris), Agoudas Hakehilos Synagogue (Paris), Sedan Synagogue (Sedan), Beth Meir Synagogue (Bastia).

G
  Georgia: Great Synagogue (Tbilisi); Oni Synagogue (Oni)
  Germany: Fasanenstrasse synagogue (Berlin); New Synagogue (Berlin); Rykestrasse Synagogue (Berlin); Alte Synagoge (Essen); New Synagogue, Dresden; Ohel Jakob synagogue (Munich); Regensburg Synagogue; Roonstrasse Synagogue (Cologne);Synagogue Selm-Bork. 
  Gibraltar: Shaar HaShamayim (The Great Synagogue), Nefusot Yehuda, Etz Haim, Abudarham Synagogue 
  Greece: Beth Shalom Synagogue (Athens, Greece) (Athens), Chalkis Synagogue (Chalcis), Beth Shalom Synagogue (Chania), Etz Hayyim Synagogue (Chania), Corfu Synagogue (Corfu), Ioanniotiki Synagogue (Ioannina), Kahal Shalom Synagogue (Rhodes), Monastir Synagogue (Thessaloniki), Etz Haim Synagogue (Larissa), Patras Synagogue (Patras), Trikala Synagogue (Trikala), Volos Synagogue (Volos)
  Guatemala: Chabad of pedro la laguna (lake atitlan) Sinagoga Maguen David (Guatemala City), Asociacion Reformista de Guatemala Adat Israel

H
  Honduras: Maguen David Synagogue, Comunidad Judia Ortodoxa Ohr Chaim de Premishlan and Synagogue(San Pedro Sula), Shevet Ajim Synagogue (Tegucigalpa)
  Hungary: see List of synagogues in Hungary

I
  India. Mumbai: Knesset Eliyahoo, Magen David, Tifferth Israel, Etz Haeem, Shaar Rason, Shaar Haramamin. In the suburbs of Mumbai there are two synagogues at Thana and Kurla. In the Konkan region of Maharashtra there are ten synagogue buildings (including those in Pen, Panvel, and a string of small towns and villages, but most are no longer or irregularly functioning, yet the buildings remain in adequate condition. 

  Indonesia: Beth Hashem Synagogue (Manado),  (Manado), Surabaya Synagogue (Surabaya), Sha'ar Hashamayim Synagogue (Tondano).
  Iran
  Iraq: Great Synagogue (Baghdad), Meir Taweig Synagogue (Baghdad)
  Ireland: Machzekei Hadas Synagogue (Dublin)
  Israel: 
  Italy: Tempio Maggiore (Rome), Sinagoga di Milano (Milan), Singagoga di Torino (Turin), Sinagoga di Bologa ([Bologna]), Sinagoga di Firenze (Florence), Sinagoghe di Venezia (Venice). See also:

J
  Jamaica: Shaare Shalom Synagogue (Kingston)
  Japan: Ohel Shelomoh Synagogue (Kobe)
  Jordan: Gerasa Synagogue (Jerash)

K
  Kazakhstan: Beit Rachel (Nur-Sultan)
  Kenya: Nairobi Hebrew Congregation (Nairobi). The former synagogue in Nakuru is now a Christian orphanage.
  Kyrgyzstan: Hesed Tikva Synagogue (Bishkek)

L
  Latvia: Peitav Synagogue (Riga)
  Lebanon: Maghen Avraham Synagogue (Beirut), Sidon Synagogue (Sidon), Bhamdoun synagogue (Bhamdoun), Ohel Jacob Synagogue (Aley), Deir el Qamar Synagogue, (Deir el Qamar)
  Libya: Chala Lakhbira, Great Synagogue, Char Bishi Synagogue (Tripoli), Yifrin Synagogue (Yifrin), Slat Abn Shaif Synagogue (Zliten)
  Lithuania: Great Synagogue of Vilnius, Choral Synagogue (Vilnius), Kaunas Synagogue (Kaunas)
  Luxembourg: Canal Synagogue, Great Synagogue

M
  Macedonia: Bet Yaakov Synagogue (Skopje)
  Malta: New Synagogue (Valletta)
  Mexico: see List of synagogues in Mexico
  Monaco:
  Morocco: see List of synagogues in Morocco
  Myanmar: Musmeah Yeshua Synagogue (Yangon)

N
  Namibia: Windhoek Hebrew Congregation (Windhoek).  The former synagogue in Keetmanshoop is now the headquarters for a local dairy.
  Netherlands: Amsterdam Esnoga (Amsterdam). 
  Netherlands Antilles: Mikve Israel-Emanuel (Curaçao)
  New Zealand: Temple Beth-El (Christchurch)
  Nigeria: Gihon Synagogue (Abuja), Synagogue Church of All Nations
  Norway: Oslo Synagogue (Oslo), Trondheim Synagogue (Trondheim)

O

P
  Pakistan: Magain Shalome Synagogue (Karachi)
  Palestinian National Authority: Shalom Al Yisrael Synagogue (Jericho)
  Panama: Kol Shearit Israel Temple, Shevet Achim Synagogue, Beth El Synagogue (Panama City)
  Paraguay: Asuncion Synagogue (Asuncion), Beit Jabad Paraguay (Asuncion)
  Peru: Sociedad de Beneficencia Israelita (Lima)
 : Beth Yaacov Synagogue (Makati)
  Poland: see List of synagogues in Poland Unfortunately this list has been moved to draft space and will probably be deleted in a couple of months. For a similar list with more than 230 synagogues see: 
  Portugal: Kadoorie Synagogue (Porto), Beit Eliyahu (Belmonte), Synagogue of Tomar (Tomar), Lisbon Synagogue (Lisbon), Sahar Hassamaim Synagogue (Ponta Delgada).

R
  Romania: see List of synagogues in Romania
  Russia: see List of synagogues in Russia

S
  Serbia: see List of synagogues in Serbia
  Singapore: Chesed-El Synagogue, Maghain Aboth Synagogue
  Slovakia: see List of synagogues in Slovakia
  Slovenia: Maribor Synagogue (Maribor), Lendava Synagogue (Lendava)
  South Africa: Tikvath Israel Synagogue (Cape Town)
  Spain: Cominidad Israelita de Barcelona (Barcelona), Benidorm Synagogue (Alicante), Synagogue Jacob Almonznino (Melilla), Synagogue Issac Benarroch (Melilla), Synagogue Solinquinos (Melilla), Beth El Synagogue (Marbella), Beth Yaacov Synagogue (Madrid), Ner Tamid Synagogue (A Coruña), Synagogue of El Transito (Toledo), Beth Minzi Synagogue (Torremolinos), La Javurá Sinagoga (Valencia), Main Synagogue of Barcelona (Barcelona)
  Sri Lanka: Chabad of Sri Lanka (Colombo)
  Sudan: Hekhal Shelomo Synagogue (Khartoum)
  Suriname: Neveh Shalom Synagogue (Paramaribo)
  Sweden: Gothenburg Synagogue (Gothenburg), Stockholm Synagogue (Stockholm), Malmö Synagogue (Malmö)
  Switzerland: Beth Yaakov Synagogue (Geneva), Hekhal Haness Synagogue (Geneva), Endingen Synagogue (Endingen, Switzerland), Lengnau Synagogue (Lengnau, Aargau), Synagoge Zürich Löwenstrasse (Zürich), Bern Synagogue (Bern)
  Syria: Midrash Dishi Synagogue (Damascus), Dura-Europos synagogue (Dura-Europos), Ilfrange Synagogue (Damascus), Jamiliah Synagogue (Aleppo), Central Synagogue of Aleppo (Aleppo), Jobar Synagogue of Elijah the prophet (Damascus), Kittab Attia (Damascus), Menarsha Synagogue (Damascus), Minyan Synagogue (Damascus), Racqy Synagogue (Damascus), Scalyn Synagogue (Damascus), Shama'a Synagogue (Damascus), Tedef Synagogue of Ezra the scribe (Tedef)

T
  Tahiti: Ahava v'Ahava Synagogue (Papeete)
  Taiwan: Landis Taipei Hotel Synagogue. Chabad Taiwan (Taipei)
  Tajikistan: Dushanbe synagogue (Dushanbe)
  Thailand: Beth Elisheva Synagogue (Bangkok), Even Chen Synagogue (Bangkok)
  Tunisia: Beit Knesset Kohanim HaDintreisa (Djerba), El Ghriba synagogue (Djerba), Zarzis Synagogue (Zarzis)
  Turkey: see List of synagogues in Turkey
  Turkmenistan: Ashkhabad Synagogue (Ashgabat)

U
  Uganda: Moses Synagogue (Nabugoye), Putti Synagogue (Putti), Namutumba Synagogue (Magada, Namutumba District), Nasenyi Synagogue (Nesenyi), Namanyonyi Synagogue (Namanyonyi)
  Ukraine: see List of synagogues in Ukraine
  United Kingdom: see List of synagogues in the United Kingdom
  United States: see List of synagogues in the United States
  Uruguay: see List of synagogues in Uruguay
  Uzbekistan: Central Synagogue Beit Menahem (Tashkent), Gumbaz Synagogue (Samarkand)

V
  Venezuela:Tiféret Israel, Hogar Jabad Lubavitch de Venezuela, Unión Israelita de Caracas, Asociación Bet El, Congregación Bet Aharón, Tiféret Israel del Este Keter Torá, Centro Bet Shemuel, Shaaré Shalom, Centro Bet Shemuel del Este,  (Caracas); Asociación Israelita de Valencia, (Valencia); Sociedad Israelita de Maracaibo, (Maracaibo); Or Meir, (Porlamar)
  Vietnam: Chabad of Vietnam (Ho Chi Minh City)
  Virgin Islands, US: Beracha Veshalom Vegmiluth Hasidim Synagogue (Saint Thomas)

W

X

Y
  Yemen: Grand synagogue of Aden (Aden), Kessar Synagogue, Dhamari Synagogue (San‘a’)

Z
  Zambia: Lusaka Synagogue (Lusaka). There were once synagogues in Ndola, Kitwe, and Mufulira, Zambia of the Copperbelt Region, but they are now African churches.  Ndola's former synagogue, now used by the Catholic Church as offices, and they built a new prayer space for church services.  In Kitwe, the former synagogue is today owned and operated by the Salvation Army.  The synagogue in Livingstone is also now an African church. There was once a Jewish community in the Copperbelt Region town of Luwansha, but it is unclear whether any former synagogue was built and still stands.
  Zimbabwe: Bulawayo Hebrew Congregation (Bulawayo), Harare Hebrew Congregation (Harare). There were once three synagogues in the Midlands region of the country—in Kadoma (building destroyed), Kitwe (building used by an African church, and Gewru (building used as a church today).

References

 Messinas, Elias. (2022). The Synagogues of Greece: A Study of Synagogues in Macedonia and Thrace: With Architectural Drawings of all Synagogues of Greece. .
 Waronker, Jay A.  Articles (2007, 2009, 2010) appear in KULANU (www.kulanu.org) on the synagogue architecture in Zambia.

External links
 Synagogues of the World on the Jewish Virtual Library
 The Jewish History Resource Center, Project of the Dinur Center for Research in Jewish History, The Hebrew University of Jerusalem
 Federation of Jewish Communities of the CIS
 JewishDirectory.com
 Worldwide directory of Chabad Centers
 Images of synagogues in the archives of the Center for Jewish Art at the Hebrew University of Jerusalem
 The Bezalel Narkiss Index of Jewish Art
 Klein Rudolf: Zsinagógák Magyarországon 1782-1918 - Synagogues in Hungary, TERC Kft., 2011